Halbarga is a town in Bhalki taluka of Bidar district in the Indian state of Karnataka.
Halbarga is about 15kms form Bhalki talku and 45kms from Bidar district in the indian state of Karnataka.
Halbarga is about 150kms from the Hyderabad city in the Indian state of Telangana.

References

Villages in Bidar district